Inka Pirqa (Quechua for "Inca wall", also spelled Inca Perkha, Incaperca, Ingapirca) or Inka Pirka (Kichwa for "Inca wall") may refer to:

 Ingapirca, a town with an archaeological site of that name in Ecuador
 Inka Pirqa (Bolivia), a mountain in Bolivia
 Inka Pirqa, a mountain in Peru